Johan Peter Andreas Anker (22 February 1838 – 27 January 1876) was a Danish military officer born in Knudsker Sogn.

He made his mark during the Second Schleswig War, especially in the Battle of Dybbøl of 1864. He retired in 1865.

References

1838 births
1876 deaths
People from Bornholm
Danish military personnel of the Second Schleswig War
19th-century Danish military personnel